Big Ideas for a Small Planet is an American documentary series on the Sundance Channel which focuses on environmental innovations such as alternative fuel and green building techniques. The series premiered on the iTunes Store prior to its release on the Sundance Channel on April 17, 2007. Simran Sethi and Majora Carter hosted the show.

Episodes

References

External links
Treehugger.com

Sundance TV original programming
2007 American television series debuts
2007 American television series endings
2000s American documentary television series
Environmental television